Robin of Sherlock is a 1985 adventure game developed by Delta 4 and published by Silversoft. It parodies the earlier games The Hobbit and Sherlock. It was written using The Quill.

The game mixes the universes of Robin Hood and Sherlock Holmes with a number of characters from other media, including Smurfs, Dorothy from The Wizard of Oz, Red Riding Hood, Goldilocks, and others. It also involves Professor Moriarty masquerading as Herne the Hunter.

References

External links 
 
 
 

1980s interactive fiction
1985 video games
Amstrad CPC games
Video games developed in the United Kingdom
ZX Spectrum games
CRL Group games
Single-player video games